Eforie Sud is part of Eforie city, Constanța County, Romania. It is a holiday resort known for its therapeutic treatments. It was called "Carmen Sylva", after the literary pseudonym of Queen Elisabeth of Romania between the two World Wars and ”Vasile Roaită” name of a communist activist from 1950 to 1962.

Seaside resorts in Romania
Articles containing video clips